Utsira Church is a parish church of the Church of Norway in Utsira Municipality in Rogaland county, Norway. It is located on the small island of Utsira. It is the church for the Utsira parish which is part of the Haugaland prosti (deanery) in the Diocese of Stavanger. The white, wooden church was built in a long church style in 1785 using designs by an unknown architect. The church seats about 100 people.

History
The earliest existing historical records of the church date back to around the year 1620, but it was likely built well before that time. According to some sources, an Irish hermit settled on the island in the middle ages and he is the one who built the first chapel on the island. In 1704 a major repair work took place, and from the description it appears that the church was then a small log building. In 1785, the old church was torn down and replaced by a new church, which mainly still stands. In 1954, the tower and sacristy were added to the building.

See also
List of churches in Rogaland

References

Utsira
Churches in Rogaland
Wooden churches in Norway
18th-century Church of Norway church buildings
Churches completed in 1785